Metcalfe is a surname, originating in Dentdale, Yorkshire, and is very common in places such as Wensleydale and Swaledale. It may refer to:

 Andrew Metcalfe, former senior Australian public servant
 Ben Metcalfe, Canadian journalist and environmentalist
 Burt Metcalfe
 Charles Metcalfe, 1st Baron Metcalfe, British administrator in India 
 Ciara Metcalfe, Irish cricketer
 Clive Metcalfe, British musician
 Daryl Metcalfe, Pennsylvania state representative
 Edward Metcalfe, British Benedictine monk
 Edward Dudley Metcalfe, friend and equerry of Edward VIII of the United Kingdom
 Edwin C. Metcalfe, American saxophonist and television station manager
 Frances Metcalfe Wolcott (1851–1933), American socialite and author
 Glenn Metcalfe, Scottish rugby player
 James Stetson Metcalfe (1858–1927), American critic and author
 Jane Metcalfe, American magazine publisher
 Jean Metcalfe, British broadcaster
 Jennifer Metcalfe, British actress
 Jesse Metcalfe, American actor
 Joanne Metcalfe (born 1969), Australian basketball player
 John Metcalfe (composer), British violist and composer
 John Metcalfe (writer), British science fiction and horror writer
 John William Metcalfe (1872-1952), British reverend and entomologist
 Jordan Metcalfe, British actor
 Philip Metcalfe, distiller and MP
 Percy Metcalfe, British artist
 Ralph Metcalfe, American athlete and politician
 Richard Metcalfe, Scottish rugby player
 Richard Lee Metcalfe, Governor of Panama Canal Zone
 Robert Metcalfe (disambiguation), several people
 Simon Metcalfe (1735–1794), American maritime fur trader
 Theophilus Metcalfe (c 1610-c 1645), English stenographer
 Thomas Metcalfe (disambiguation), several people
 Sir Thomas Theophilus Metcalfe, 4th Baronet, Honourable East India Company servant, Agent to Governor General of India
 Vic Metcalfe, English professional footballer.
 Wendy Metcalfe, Canadian journalist, editor and news executive

See also
Metcalf (surname)

External links
The Metcalfe Society - genealogical organization

English-language surnames

de:Metcalfe
fr:Metcalfe